St. Anthony's Chapel may refer to:

 St. Anthony's Chapel, Aachen, Germany
 Saint Anthony's Chapel (Pittsburgh, Pennsylvania), United States
 Saint Anthony's Chapel at the pilgrimage site Svatý Antonínek, Czech Republic
 St Anthony's Chapel, a ruin in Holyrood Park, Edinburgh, Scotland

See also
 St. Anthony's Church (disambiguation)